Pavel Puškár (born 19 April 1965) is a Czech bobsledder. He competed at the 1992, 1994, 1998 and the 2002 Winter Olympics.

References

1965 births
Living people
Czech male bobsledders
Olympic bobsledders of Czechoslovakia
Olympic bobsledders of the Czech Republic
Bobsledders at the 1992 Winter Olympics
Bobsledders at the 1994 Winter Olympics
Bobsledders at the 1998 Winter Olympics
Bobsledders at the 2002 Winter Olympics
Sportspeople from Most (city)